Cecilia Vignolo (born 5 September 1971) is a Uruguayan visual artist, teacher, and communicator.

She currently works in the communication area of Uruguay's National Museum of Visual Arts. Since 1991 she has held several exhibitions as a visual artist, both individually and collectively, and has won a series of awards and distinctions.

Individual shows
 1995 – "De las Américas", Teatro Macció, San José
 1996 – "De los vientres de las más", (sound setting: Daniel Maggiolo), Cabildo y Archivo Histórico, Montevideo
 1998 – "La exterioridad de la interioridad del cuerpo humano", Sala Vaz Ferreira, Montevideo
 1998 – "Hay Corazón", La Creperie, Montevideo
 2002 – "Respaldos", Colección Engelman Ost, Montevideo
 2002 – "Yo soy", Museo del Azulejo, Montevideo
 2005 – "Funciona", Carlson Tower Gallery, North Park University, Chicago, traveling at Unión Latina, Palacio Lapido, Montevideo
 2005 – "Abrazario", Faculty of Architecture, November, Montevideo
 2006 – "Hay algo más que quiera decir”, Sala Dirección Nacional de Cultura, MEC, Montevideo
 2009 – "El reverso del paisaje", Juan Manuel Blanes Museum, Montevideo

Awards
 1977 – First Prize, Painting Contest at the Garden Club of Punta del Este
 1984 – First Prize, School Contest of the Ministry of Public Health, collective
 1992 – Paul Cézanne Revelation Award, Museum of Visual Arts, Montevideo
 1995 – First Prize, United Award, American Museum, Maldonado
 1995 – Honorable Mention, Municipal Hall, Installation, Montevideo
 1997 – Honorable Mention, First Craft Object Biennial, Montevideo
 1999 – Under-Thirty Award, Municipal Hall, Montevideo
 2001 – Special Award, 49th National Salon of Visual Arts, "Salon de Belleza", Montevideo
 2001 – First Prize, Municipal Hall, collective installation "Imaginario Montevideo", Montevideo
 2002 – Honorable Mention, Municipal Hall, installation "ser / estar", Montevideo
 2007 – Paul Cézanne Award, Second Prize, Montevideo
 2007 – National María Freire Award, First Eduardo Víctor Haedo Prize
 2013 – Fundación Unión Award, 10th Salto Biennial, Salto, Uruguay

References

External links
 
 

1971 births
Living people
20th-century Uruguayan sculptors
21st-century Uruguayan sculptors
People from Montevideo
Uruguayan women sculptors
20th-century Uruguayan women artists
21st-century Uruguayan women artists